Vanessa Howard (born Vanessa Tolhurst, 10 October 1948, Shoreham-by-Sea, United Kingdom – 23 November 2010), later known as Vanessa Chartoff, was a British film actress and professional backup singer.

Early life
Howard was orphaned by the age of three, after which she and her older sister were adopted. Both girls were performers; Vanessa attended the Phildene Stage School, a co-educational independent school at Chiswick, west London, and her sister attended the Guildhall School of Music and Drama.

Career
After leaving school at fifteen, her first professional job was as a dancer and singer at seaside Llandudno, for Clarkson Roses Twinkle company, in a summer revue. Later engagements included the Players' Theatre, in their Old Time Music Hall, and one year with the George Mitchell Singers as a singer and dancer, leading to TV. 

In 1966, Howard appeared in On the Level, a musical in the West End. After, she appeared in The Impossible Years, a play, with David Tomlinson.

In 1967, on Christmas Day, Howard appeared in Aladdin, a musical, on British television with Cliff Richard.

Howard later starred in exploitation and horror films, including The Blood Beast Terror and Mumsy, Nanny, Sonny and Girly. The box-office failure of her later projects resulted in her decision to retire from acting.

Personal life
Howard married film producer Robert Chartoff in July 1970. At 25, they moved to USA, where they raised their son, Charley Chartoff, and 3 children from Robert's first marriage. The couple divorced some time prior to 1992. Following her divorce, she worked with California programs dedicated to helping recently divorced homemakers reintegrate into the workforce, including the Mission Valley Regional Occupation Center in Fremont, California. She died in Los Angeles on 23 November 2010, of complications from COPD.

Recognition
A retrospective on her life – assembled by horror journalist Preston Fassel with the cooperation of her family and the assistance of UK blogger Richard Halfhide – appeared in The Dark Side #169 and Spring 2014 issue of the horror journal Screem, addressing multiple rumours about her life, career, and the time in between her retirement and death.

Filmography
Here We Go Round the Mulberry Bush (1967) - Audrey
 Sam and Janet, 1968, S2E1, with John Junkin, Joan Sims, and Vivienne Martin
The Blood Beast Terror (1968) - Meg Quennell
Corruption (1968) - Kate
This, That and the Other (1969) - Barbara (segment "That")
Mumsy, Nanny, Sonny and Girly (1969) - Girly
Lock Up Your Daughters! (1969) - Hoyden
Some Girls Do (1969) - Robot Number Seven
All the Way Up (1970) - Avril Hadfield
The Rise and Rise of Michael Rimmer (1970) - Patricia Cartwright
What Became of Jack and Jill? (1972) - Jill Standish
The Picture of Dorian Gray (1973) (TV) - Sybil Vane

References

External links
 
 Vanessa Howard — tcmdb
 Vanessa Howard — BFI
 Vanessa Howard — Festival de Cannes

1948 births
2010 deaths
English film actresses
English television actresses
People from Shoreham-by-Sea
20th-century English actresses
Deaths from emphysema